"Ashtrays and Heartbreaks" is a song by American recording artist Snoop Lion featuring American recording artist Miley Cyrus. It was released on April 4, 2013 by Berhane Sound System, Vice Records, Mad Decent, and RCA Records as the fourth single from his twelfth studio album Reincarnated (2013).

Background
"Ashtrays and Heartbreaks" premiered on Major Lazer's SoundCloud account on April 3, 2013. The song is performed by Snoop Dogg (under the name Snoop Lion) as a lead artist and Miley Cyrus as a featured artist, and produced by Major Lazer, Ariel Rechtshaid, and Dre Skull. The following day, the track was released as a digital single on iTunes by Berhane Sound System. The feature was Miley Cyrus' first single since 2012. A lyric video was uploaded to Snoop's Vevo channel on YouTube. In the United States, the single officially impacted rhythmic contemporary radio on April 29, 2013 and then contemporary hit radio on May 28.

Music video
The video was filmed in April, 2013 by director P. R. Brown and premiered on Snoop Lion's Vevo on May 30, 2013. It features a cameo of Diplo, a member of Major Lazer.

Charts

Release history

References

2013 singles
2010s ballads
American reggae songs
Snoop Dogg songs
Songs written by Snoop Dogg
Miley Cyrus songs
Reggae fusion songs
Songs written by Diplo
RCA Records singles
2013 songs
Song recordings produced by Ariel Rechtshaid
Songs written by Ariel Rechtshaid
Songs written by Angela Hunte